Small River Caves Provincial Park is a provincial park in British Columbia, Canada.

References

External links

Regional District of Fraser-Fort George
Provincial parks of British Columbia
Protected areas established in 2000
2000 establishments in British Columbia